Jasmin Fejzić (born 15 May 1986) is a Bosnian professional footballer who plays as a goalkeeper for German club Eintracht Braunschweig.

Club career
Fejzić began his career with TSV Eltingen and moved to Stuttgarter Kickers in 2001. In July 2004 he was promoted to the reserve team. About a year later, on 23 June 2005, he joined SpVgg Greuther Fürth. Fejzić played 34 games for the club's reserve team in the Oberliga Bayern and was then loaned out to Eintracht Braunschweig on 23 May 2007. After 41 games with Eintracht Braunschweig he returned to SpVgg Greuther Fürth.

For the 2015–16 2. Bundesliga season, Fejzić returned to Eintracht Braunschweig, signing a two-year contract.

International career
Fejzić was called up to national team by manager Safet Sušić during qualifiers for 2014 FIFA World Cup and for the tournament itself, but hasn't seen any playing time. He earned his first and only cap for the side as a 62nd minute sub on 4 September 2014 during a friendly against Liechtenstein, having waited over 12 months for his chance since being first time called up for game versus Greece in March 2013.

References

External links

1986 births
Living people
People from Živinice
Bosniaks of Bosnia and Herzegovina
Association football goalkeepers
Bosnia and Herzegovina footballers
Bosnia and Herzegovina international footballers
2014 FIFA World Cup players
Stuttgarter Kickers II players
Stuttgarter Kickers players
SpVgg Greuther Fürth players
SpVgg Greuther Fürth II players
Eintracht Braunschweig players
Eintracht Braunschweig II players
VfR Aalen players
1. FC Magdeburg players
Oberliga (football) players
Regionalliga players
2. Bundesliga players
3. Liga players
Bosnia and Herzegovina expatriate footballers
Expatriate footballers in Germany
Bosnia and Herzegovina expatriate sportspeople in Germany